Beckwourth Pass is the lowest mountain pass in the Sierra Nevada mountain range at an elevation of .

Geography 

California State Route 70 crosses over Beckwourth Pass and the Feather River Route of the former Western Pacific, now Union Pacific Railroad beneath it via the Chilcoot Tunnel. Route 70 and the railroad line provide an alternate route between Sacramento, California and Reno, Nevada when Interstate 80 and the Overland Route, which cross the Sierra Nevada near Donner Pass, are impassable due to winter storms.

History

James Beckwourth is credited with the discovery of Beckwourth Pass in 1850. In 1851, he improved what was originally a Native American path into Sierra Valley to create his Beckwourth Trail. The trail ran from Truckee Meadows (what is now known as Sparks, Nevada) through the pass into California and on to Marysville.  
  
In late summer of 1851, James Beckwourth led the first wagon train of settlers along the Beckwourth Trail into Marysville.

Between 1851 and 1854, the Beckwourth Trail was frequently traveled. However, in 1854, use dropped sharply when the Beckwourth Trail became a toll road. The toll cost to move a ton of freight from Bidwell Bar to Quincy was about $18. This made using the Beckwourth Road an expensive enterprise and the use of the Beckwourth Trail declined.

Between 1895 and 1916, the pass was used by the Sierra Valley & Mohawk Railway narrow gauge. The abandoned right-of-way is still visible on the south, and eastern slope of the pass.

This line is now owned and operated by the Union Pacific Railroad.

In 1937, a bronze plaque was erected at Beckwourth Pass by the Native Daughters of the Golden West to commemorate the discoverer and the pioneers who passed along the trail.

On August 8, 1939, Beckwourth Pass was designated as California Historical Landmark Number 336.

See also
Ina Coolbrith
Mount Ina Coolbrith

References

California Trail
Mountain passes of the Sierra Nevada (United States)
Landforms of Plumas County, California
Rail mountain passes of the United States
California Historical Landmarks